Recombination may refer to:
Carrier generation and recombination, in semiconductors, the cancellation of mobile charge carriers (electrons and holes)
Crossover (genetic algorithm), also called recombination
Genetic recombination, the process by which genetic material is broken and joined to other genetic material
Bacterial recombination
Homologous recombination
Plasma recombination, the formation of neutral atoms from the capture of free electrons by the cations in a plasma
Recombination (chemistry), the opposite of dissociation
Cage effect, a special kind of recombination reaction that appears in condensed phases
Recombination (cosmology), the time at which protons and electrons formed neutral hydrogen in the timeline of the Big Bang